East Renfrewshire is one of 32 council areas of Scotland. Until 1975, it formed part of the county of Renfrewshire for local government purposes along with the modern council areas of Renfrewshire and Inverclyde. These three council areas together still form a single lieutenancy area called Renfrewshire.

The East Renfrewshire council area was formed in 1996, as a successor to the Eastwood district which had existed between 1975 and 1996, with the Levern valley (which came from Renfrew district) being annexed. East Renfrewshire has borders with East Ayrshire, Glasgow, Renfrewshire, South Lanarkshire, and North Ayrshire.

History 
East Renfrewshire was created in 1996 under the Local Government etc. (Scotland) Act 1994, which replaced Scotland's previous local government structure of upper-tier regions and lower-tier districts with unitary council areas providing all local government services. East Renfrewshire covered the whole of the abolished Eastwood district and part of Renfrew district, being the Barrhead electoral division, which roughly corresponded to the pre-1975 burgh of Barrhead and parish of Neilston, both lying in the valley of the Levern Water. The new council also took over the functions of the abolished Strathclyde Regional Council within the area.

The area's name references its location within the historic county of Renfrewshire, which had been abolished for local government purposes in 1975 when Eastwood district and Strathclyde region had been created. East Renfrewshire forms part of the Renfrewshire lieutenancy.

The area that is now East Renfrewshire has been inhabited since prehistoric times. At Dunwan Hill near Eaglesham and at Duncarnock near Newton Mearns there were Iron Age hill forts, both thought to have been occupied between around 1200BC and 400AD.

During the industrial revolution the Levern valley became a centre for the textiles industry, with several mills being established in Neilston and Barrhead.

Giffnock initially grew to house the workers at Giffnock Quarries, which opened in 1835. The honey-coloured stone from Giffnock was used at Glasgow University and Glasgow Central station among many other buildings. Following the development of the railways in the mid-nineteenth century, the parts of the area close to Glasgow became increasingly suburban in character.

In 1941, Rudolf Hess, one of Adolf Hitler's top deputies within the Nazi Party, parachuted into Floors Farm, near the village of Waterfoot, on a secret mission to meet the Duke of Hamilton and Brandon for peace negotiations. The botched landing led to his capture and arrest.

In 1971 a gas explosion at a parade of shops in Clarkston killed 22 people and injured more than 100.

In a 2007 Reader's Digest poll, East Renfrewshire was voted the second best place in Britain to raise a family, ranking just behind East Dunbartonshire to the north of Glasgow.

In January 2008, East Renfrewshire became the first Scottish local authority to create a Facebook page to publicise its services.

Geography
East Renfrewshire covers an area to the south and south-west of Glasgow. Many of the district's settlements are classed as part of the Greater Glasgow urban area for statistical purposes. The area becomes more rural away from the Glasgow urban area with areas of moorland and numerous small lochs, many of which have been turned into reservoirs. The moors include part of the Whitelee Wind Farm.

A 2011 survey showed that 41% of Scotland's Jewish population lived in East Renfrewshire, making up 2.4% of the area's population.

The area is divided into eleven community council areas, all of which have community councils:

Barrhead
Broom, Kirkhill and Mearnskirk
Busby
Clarkston
Crookfur, Greenfarm and Mearns Village
Eaglesham and Waterfoot
Giffnock
Neilston
Netherlee and Stamperland
Thornliebank
Uplawmoor

Economy
East Renfrewshire is home to many small to medium businesses. The interests of these businesses are looked after by the East Renfrewshire Chamber of Commerce.

The local newspapers are the Barrhead News, covering the local authority with emphasis on the western half of the area, which primarily includes the town of Barrhead and the villages of Neilston and Uplawmoor, and the Glasgow South and Eastwood Extra, which is delivered free to homes and businesses, which has its emphasis on the eastern half of the local authority, but also covers news across the western half as well as the south of Glasgow.

Governance

Political control
The first election to East Renfrewshire Council was held in 1995, initially operating as a shadow authority alongside the outgoing authorities until the new system came into force on 1 April 1996. Political control of the council since 1996 has been as follows:

Leadership
The leaders of the council since 1996 have been:

Premises

The council has its headquarters at Eastwood Park on Rouken Glen Road in Giffnock, in a building which was completed in 1980 for the former Eastwood District Council.

The council also has an office and customer service centre at 211 Main Street in Barrhead, built in 2003.

Elections
Since 2007 elections have been held every five years under the single transferable vote system, introduced by the Local Governance (Scotland) Act 2004. Election results since 1995 have been as follows:

Wards

Six multi-member wards (20 seats) were created for the 2007 election, replacing 20 single-member wards which had been in place since the creation of the council in 1995. This representation decreased to 18 seats across five renamed and redrawn wards for the 2017 election:

Barrhead, Liboside and Uplawmoor (4 seats)
Newton Mearns North and Neilston (3 seats)
Giffnock and Thornliebank (3 seats)
Clarkston, Netherlee and Williamwood (4 seats)
Newton Mearns South and Eaglesham (4 seats)

References

External links
 East Renfrewshire Council official website

 East Renfrewshire Online
 East Renfrewshire Events Guide
 East Renfrewshire History - Parishes of Cathcart, Eastwood & Mearns

 
Council areas of Scotland